Koeberg nuclear power station is a nuclear power station in South Africa. It is currently the only one on the entire African continent. It is located 30 km north of Cape Town, near Melkbosstrand on the west coast of South Africa. Koeberg is owned and operated by the country's only national electricity supplier, Eskom.

Design
Koeberg contains two pressurised water reactors based on a design by Framatome of France. Framatome has a 51% shareholding in local South African company Lesedi Nuclear Services which performs upgrade and maintenance projects at Koeberg. Koeberg supplies power to the national grid so that over-capacity can be redistributed to the rest of the country on an as-needed basis. Fuel stock used within the reactor is enriched uranium dioxide pellets containing gadolinium, contained in fuel rods. Koeberg is rated at 1,860 MW, its average annual production is 13,668 GWh and it has two large turbine generators (2 × 970 MW).

Each reactor delivers 970 MW (gross) and is capable of delivering 930 MW (net) to the grid.

The power station was constructed near Cape Town to be the sole provider of power in the Western Cape after fossil-fuel power stations were deemed too small and too expensive to be viable. Nuclear power was considered because it was more economical than transporting coal to the existing fossil-fuel power stations, and construction of new fossil-fuel power-stations, which would have required 300 m tall chimneys to comply with clean-air legislation. Athlone Power Station in the city was too small to provide Cape Town's needs, and the Paarden Island power station (itself too small) has been demolished.

Koeberg was one of the first nuclear power stations designed to be specifically resistant to earthquakes. The reactors at the Koeberg nuclear power station are built upon an aseismic raft designed – on the basis of a mid-1970s hazard study - to withstand a magnitude 7 earthquake at a focal distance of about 10 km, 0.3g zero period ground acceleration (ZPGA).  The largest recorded earthquake in the Cape Town area has been 6.5 magnitude at Jan Biesjes Kraal in 1809.

The reactor at Koeberg is cooled by cold water from the Atlantic Ocean pumped through an isolated circuit at 80 tons a second. Low and intermediate level waste from Koeberg is transported by road in steel and concrete containers to a rural disposal site at Vaalputs, 600 km away in the Kalahari Desert.

The power station was originally located outside the metropolitan area, but urban growth has exceeded expectations in the intervening years, so that the power station is now close to suburban housing. The administration enforces maximum housing density regulations in case of evacuation, which precludes the construction of high rise buildings. The buffer zone around the nuclear power station forms the 22 km2 Koeberg Nature Reserve, open to the public and containing more than 210 species of birds and a number of mammal species including zebra, eland and springbok.

History

Construction of the power station began in 1976, and Unit 1 was synchronized to the grid on 4 April 1984. Unit 2 followed on 25 July 1985.

On 17 December 1982, Umkhonto we Sizwe, the armed wing of the ANC attacked Koeberg while it was still under construction. Damage was estimated at R 500 million and the commissioning of the power station was put back by 18 months. The bomber was Rodney Wilkinson, who had previously represented South Africa in international fencing tournaments.

In August 2002 twelve Greenpeace activists obtained access to the station. Six of them scaled the wall to hang up an anti-nuclear protest banner. The twelve were arrested and fined.

At the end of 2005, Koeberg started experiencing numerous technical difficulties. On 11 November 2005, a fault on a transmission busbar caused the reactor to go into safe mode, cutting supply to most of the Western Cape for about two hours. On 16 November a fire under a 400 kV transmission line caused the line to trip, causing severe voltage dips which resulted in Koeberg once again shutting down. Various parts of the Cape were left without electricity for hours at a time. On the evening of 23 November, a routine inspection of the backup safety system revealed a below-spec concentration of an important chemical, resulting in a controlled shutdown of the reactor. Due to the sufficiency of backup supply, major power cuts were not experienced until Friday 25 November, when the backup capacity began running out. At this point, rotational load shedding was employed, with customers being switched off in stages for most of the day. Koeberg was re-synchronised to the national grid on Saturday 26 November.

On Sunday 25 December 2005, the generator of Unit 1 was damaged. While the generator was being powered up after scheduled refuelling and maintenance, a loose bolt, which was left inside the generator caused severe damage, forcing it to be shut down. Subsequent to the unexpected unavailability of Unit 1, Unit 2 was also brought down for scheduled refuelling, resulting in a severe shortage of supply to the Western Cape. This resulted in widespread load shedding in order to maintain the stability of the network. A replacement rotor for Unit 1 was shipped in from France and the unit was brought back into operation in May 2006.

On 18 and 19 February 2007 large parts of the Western Cape again experienced blackouts due to a controlled shutdown of Koeberg. According to Eskom and the City of Cape Town, power cuts were to continue until 26 February 2007, however power supply problems continued beyond this date.

The estimated economic losses due to the power cuts was over R 500 M as at February 2007, and was estimated to rise to possibly as high as R 2 billion.

On 12 September 2010, 91 members of staff were contaminated with cobalt-58 dust in an incident that appears confined to the station.

The government's agreed 2019 Integrated Resource Plan (IRP) plans a 20-year life-extension for Koeberg to 2044, and a delayed nuclear new build programme with a scenario that may build new capacity after 2030.

On 10 September 2020, Eskom announced it will install six new steam generators in 2021. In 2022 the Mail & Guardian reported that an "estimated 250 to 300 skilled persons"  had "left Koeberg over the past year" thereby raising concerns over the plant's ability to function properly in the near future.

Production Koeberg 1/2 1984-2017 (TWh/yr)

Post Fukushima stress tests
After the Fukushima Daiichi nuclear disaster, seismic safety at Koeberg was reevaluated in conjunction with the IAEA.  Although Koeberg was designed for 0.3g zero period ground acceleration (ZPGA), a magnitude 7 earthquake, stress tests evaluated Koeberg against a 0.5g ZPGA.
Overall Koeberg found to be seismically robust and well designed, with some areas for attention and improvement that were highlighted.

New build

Duynefontein next door on the northern side of Koeberg is a proposed site for a new nuclear power station.

Opposition to Koeberg
South Africa's nuclear industry has seen its fair share of opposition, chiefly from environmentalists concerned about safety issues such as radioactive waste, and anti-war activists concerned about nuclear proliferation and use of atomic weapons. Current campaigns against nuclear energy are being run by Earthlife Africa and Koeberg Alert.

See also

 List of nuclear reactors
 List of power stations in South Africa

Notes

References
 Koeberg on the Eskom-Website
 Nuclear Tourist. Includes a picture.
 Koeberg details
 Evacuation modelling for Koeberg
 Google Map Satellite Image
 January 2006 Eskom media release on Koeberg's problems.

 

Energy infrastructure completed in 1985
Nuclear power stations in South Africa
Nuclear power stations in Africa
Buildings and structures in Cape Town
Buildings and structures in the Western Cape
Economy of the Western Cape
Nuclear power stations using pressurized water reactors
France–South Africa relations
1985 establishments in South Africa
20th-century architecture in South Africa